Maria Sergeevna Shegurova (born 8 June 1993) is a Russian female badminton player.

Achievements

BWF International Challenge/Series
Women's doubles

Mixed doubles

 BWF International Challenge tournament
 BWF International Series tournament
 BWF Future Series tournament

References

External links 

1993 births
Living people
Sportspeople from Perm, Russia
Russian female badminton players
21st-century Russian women